A Gaussian year is defined as 365.2568983 days. It was adopted by Carl Friedrich Gauss as the length of the sidereal year in his studies of the dynamics of the solar system.
A slightly different value is now accepted as the length of the sidereal year,
and the value accepted by Gauss is given a special name.

A particle of negligible mass, that orbits a body of 1 solar mass in this period, has a mean axis for its orbit of 1 astronomical unit by definition.  The value is derived from Kepler's third law as

where

k is the Gaussian gravitational constant.

See also

References

Types of year
Astronomical coordinate systems